Gisela Cossa (born 17 June 1999) is a Mozambican swimmer. She competed in the women's 50 metre backstroke event at the 2017 World Aquatics Championships. She also competed at the 2015 African Games.

References

External links
 

1999 births
Living people
Mozambican female backstroke swimmers
Place of birth missing (living people)
African Games competitors for Mozambique
Swimmers at the 2015 African Games